The 2021 Ole Miss Rebels softball team represents the University of Mississippi in the 2021 NCAA Division I softball season. The Rebels play their home games at the Ole Miss Softball Complex.

Previous season

The Rebels finished the 2020 season 12–13 overall, and 0–3 in the SEC. The season was cut short due to the COVID-19 pandemic. Following the season, interim head coach Ruben Felix was not retained. He took over for former head coach, Mike Smith, who resigned in December 2019. Minnesota head coach Jamie Trachsel was hired on April 24, 2020.

Schedule and results
{| class="toccolours" width=95% style="clear:both; margin:1.5em auto; text-align:center;"
|-
! colspan=2 style="" | 2021 Ole Miss Rebels Softball Game Log
|-
! colspan=2 style="" | Regular Season 
|- valign="top"
|

|-
|

|-
|
{| class="wikitable collapsible" style="margin:auto; width:100%; text-align:center;"
! colspan=12 style="padding-left:4em;" | April 
|-
! Date
! Opponent
! Rank
! Site/Stadium
! Score
! Win
! Loss
! Save
! TV
! Attendance
! Overall Record
! SEC Record
|- align="center" bgcolor="#ffdddd"
|April 1|| at No. 15  || || Tiger ParkBaton Rouge, LA || L 0–1(8) || Shelbi Sunseri (6–3) || Anna Borgen (7–4) ||  || SECN+ || 685 || 21–12 || 5–5
|- align="center" bgcolor="#ffdddd"
|April 2|| at No. 15 LSU || || Tiger Park || L 2–3 || Ali Kilponen (5–3) || Savannah Diederich (8–7) ||  || SECN+ || 952 || 21–13 || 5–6
|- align="center" bgcolor="#ddffdd"
|April 3|| at No. 15 LSU || || Tiger Park || W 9–4(8) || Savannah Diederich (9–7)  || Shelbi Sunseri (6–4) ||  || SECN+ || 930 || 22–13 || 6–6
|- align="center" bgcolor="#ddffdd"
|April 6|| Central Arkansas ||  || Ole Miss Softball Complex || W 4–1 || Anna Borgen (8–4) || Kayla Beaver (11–4) || Savannah Diederich (1) || SECN+ || 201 || 23–13 ||
|- align="center" bgcolor="#ddffdd"
|April 9||  ||  || Ole Miss Softball Complex || W 8–0(5) || Savannah Diederich (10–7) || Leah Powell (5–2) ||  || SECN+ || 223 || 24–13 || 7–6
|- align="center" bgcolor="#ddffdd"
|April 10|| South Carolina ||  || Ole Miss Softball Complex || W 8–5 || Ava Tillmann (5–1) || Rachel Vaughan (2–1) ||  || SECN || 361 || 25–13 || 8–6
|- align="center" bgcolor="#ffdddd"
|April 11|| South Carolina ||  || Ole Miss Softball Complex || L 1–10(5) || Cayla Drotar (2–4) || Savannah Diederich (10–8) ||  || SECN+ || 307 || 25–14 || 8–7
|- align="center" bgcolor="#ddffdd"
|April 14||  || || Ole Miss Softball Complex || W 11–0(5) || Landyn Bruce (3–0) || Mariah Nichols (1–8) ||  || SECN+ || 210 || 26–14  ||
|- align="center" bgcolor="#ddffdd"
|April 16|| at  || || Davis DiamondCollege Station, TX || W 2–1 || Anna Borgen (9–4) || Makinzy Herzog (10–3) || Savannah Diederich (2)  || SECN+ || 253 || 27–14 || 9–7
|- align="center" bgcolor="#ddfdd"
|April 17|| at Texas A&M || || Davis Diamond || W 3–1 || Ava Tillmann (6–1) || Kayla Poynter (8–4) || Savannah Diederich (3) || SECN+ || 491 || 28–14 || 10–7
|- align="center" bgcolor="#ffdddd"
|April 18|| at Texas A&M || || Davis Diamond || L 3–4 || Grace Uribe (7–3) || Ava Tillmann (6–2) || Makinzy Herzog (3) || SECN+ || 382 || 28–15 || 10–8
|- align="center" bgcolor="#ddffdd"
|April 21||  ||  || Ole Miss Softball Complex || W 8–0(6) || Ava Tillmann (7–2) || Emily Brown (2–1) ||  || SECN+ || 139 || 29–15 ||
|- align="center" bgcolor="#ddffdd"
|April 23||  ||  || Ole Miss Softball Complex || W 1–0(8) || Anna Borgen (10–4) || Shelby Lowe (12–5) ||  || SECN || 291 || 30–15 || 11–8
|- align="center" bgcolor="#ddffdd"
|April 24|| Auburn ||  || Ole Miss Softball Complex || W 6–1 || Savannah Diederich (11–8) || Maddie Penta (8–7) ||  || SECN || 513 || 31–15 || 12–8
|- align="center" bgcolor="#ffdddd"
|April 25|| Auburn ||  || Ole Miss Softball Complex || ''L 1–3 || Shelby Lowe (13–5) || Ava Tillmann (7–3) ||  || SECN+ || 550 || 31–16 || 12–9
|- align="center" bgcolor="#ddffdd"
|April 30|| No. 25  ||  || Ole Miss Softball Complex || W 8–2 || Anna Borgen (11–4) || Breanna Vasquez (4–3) ||  || SECN+ || 239 || 32–16 ||
|}
|-
|

|-
! colspan=2 style="" | Post-Season 
|-
|

|-
|

|- 
! colspan=9 | Legend:       = Win       = Loss       = CanceledBold = Ole Miss team memberRankings are based on the team's current ranking in the NFCA poll.
|}Source:'''

Tucson Regional

See also
2021 Ole Miss Rebels baseball team

References

Ole Miss
Ole Miss Rebels softball seasons
Ole Miss Rebels softball